Golden Hills is a place-name that can refer to:

Golden Hills, California
Golden Hills (Russia), a Saltovo-Mayaki archaeological site in southern Russia, near Rostov